Kurth is a ghost town in the town of Grant, Clark County, Wisconsin, United States. The community appeared on USGS maps as late as 1954.

History
The community was named for Robert Kurth, a grain merchant.

Notes

Geography of Clark County, Wisconsin
Ghost towns in Wisconsin